Chaetomitrium is a genus of mosses in the family Symphyodontaceae.

Species list

References

External links

Moss genera
Hypnales